Nashville Airplane is the 27th album by Lester Flatt and Earl Scruggs released in 1968 on the Columbia Limited Edition label. It was recorded shortly before their breakup in 1969. Lester Flatt resisted the change in direction (although Earl Scruggs embraced it) to a point that led to the breakup.

Track listing
"Like a Rolling Stone" (Bob Dylan)
"Folsom Prison Blues" (Johnny Cash)
"Gentle on My Mind" (John Hartford)
"If I Were a Carpenter" (Tim Hardin)
"Freida Florentine" (Gary Scruggs)
"I'll Be Your Baby Tonight" (Bob Dylan)
"Rainy Day Women#12 & 35" (Bob Dylan)
"Catch The Wind" (Donovan)
"Long Road to Houston" (Norman Stevens)
"The Times They Are A-Changin'" (Bob Dylan)
"Universal Soldier" (Buffy Sainte-Marie)

Personnel
Kenny Buttrey - drums
Bobby Moore, Henry Strzelecki - bass guitar
Norbert Putnam - bass guitar, harpsichord
Charlie Daniels, Jerry Shook, Johnny Johnson - rhythm guitar  
Boomer Clarke, Jake Tullock - vocals
Paul Warren - vocals, violin 
Josh "Buck" Graves - dobro
Gary Scruggs - vocals, tambourine  
Randy Scruggs - lead guitar, 12-string guitar, 5-string dobro

Production
Sound Engineers - Charlie Bragg, Neil Wilburn & Jim Williamson
Stereo Engineer - Mike Figlio
Cover Art - Thomas B. Allen

References

1968 albums
Columbia Records albums
Earl Scruggs albums
Lester Flatt albums
Albums produced by Bob Johnston